Seddera semhahensis is a species of plant in the family Convolvulaceae. It is endemic to Yemen.  Its natural habitat is subtropical or tropical dry shrubland.

References

Endemic flora of Socotra
semhahensis
Vulnerable plants
Taxonomy articles created by Polbot